Cottbus-Neuhausen Airport  is a civilian airport located in Neuhausen/Spree, approximately  south-east of Cottbus in Brandenburg, Germany.

External links 
  

Airports in Brandenburg
Buildings and structures in Cottbus